Nemanja Jović (born 8 August 2002) is a professional footballer who plays as a forward for Partizan. Born in Bosnia he represents Serbia.

Club career
On 16 December 2020, Jović made his official senior debut for the club in a 4–0 home league victory over FK Mladost Lučani, coming on as an 69th-minute substitute for Seydouba Soumah.

International career
He made his debut for Serbia national football team on 7 June 2021 in a friendly against Jamaica.

Career statistics

International

References

External links
 

2002 births
Living people
People from Zvornik
Serbs of Bosnia and Herzegovina
Association football forwards
FK Partizan players
Serbian footballers
Serbian SuperLiga players
Serbia youth international footballers
Serbia under-21 international footballers
Serbia international footballers